Kalateh-ye Now (also Romanized as Kalāteh-ye Now; also known as Kalāteh-ye Mollā) is a village in Soleyman Rural District, Soleyman District, Zaveh County, Razavi Khorasan Province, Iran. At the 2006 census, its population was 245, in 56 families.

References 

Populated places in Zaveh County